The Golden Comb was an anti-ship tactic developed by the  during the Second World War for use against Allied convoys taking supplies to the Soviet Union by the Arctic route. It was first employed against Convoy PQ 18 in September 1942.

Background
Germany had no torpedo bomber force, in contrast to the forces of other world powers, even the other Axis nations like Italy with the land-based  or the Imperial Japanese Navy Air Service which used the Type 91 torpedo in the Attack on Pearl Harbor, having revealed its manufacturing details to Germany in early August 1942.

Two  , III/ (III/KG 26) and III/ (III/KG 30), were assigned to train and equip as anti-ship /anti-convoy units, with Heinkel He 111 and Junkers Ju 88 bombers, modified to carry two air-dropped torpedoes under the wings.

The attack was planned for use in the half light period of dawn or dusk and would be in conjunction with a simultaneous dive bombing attack to divide opposing anti-aircraft fire.

The tracks of up to eighty torpedoes heading towards the target was likened to the teeth of a comb.

In action
The first use of the  occurred on 13 September 1942 against the Allied convoy PQ 18, a collection of 35 merchant ships, with a strong escort of 18 warships including the escort carrier . After a dive-bombing attack by I/KG 30, the convoy was approached by the torpedo-bombers, I/KG 26, in a formation of 42 aircraft. The sight was described by one observer as "a huge flight of nightmare locusts". Despite anti-aircraft fire from the ships and their escorts, the group continued on course, dropping their torpedoes as planned. The convoy commodore ordered a turn to starboard to sail parallel to the torpedo tracks. In the confusion the signal was misread by the ships of the starboard columns, which continued ahead. Eight ships, six in the outermost starboard column and two further in, were sunk. The  aircraft made more attacks on PQ 18 after the torpedo attack and two more ships were sunk but no successes similar to the first day were achieved. Aircraft losses mounted after the first attack and by the end of the air offensive against PQ 18, forty aircraft from the two groups had been lost. Following PQ 18, Arctic convoys were suspended until December 1942 when the next series of convoys was able to travel under cover of the Arctic night.

Aftermath
Devastating as the  had proved against PQ 18, the Allies quickly found counter-measures which reduced its effectiveness and inflicted crippling losses on the attackers. The approaching formation was unable to take evasive action and was vulnerable to AA fire from the ships and escorts and attacks by fighter aircraft from the carrier. The combination of gun and fighter attack, aided by the bold and aggressive handling of Avenger and the AA ship, Ulster Queen, caused the bombers to release and break formation earlier and earlier in their approach runs as the battle progressed.

Combing the tracks (turning into the track of torpedoes to present a smaller target) was made more effective against torpedoes running in the same direction. The confusion over signals that contributed to the ship losses in PQ 18 during the first  attack was not repeated. Other air forces had found torpedo attacks were more effective against ships when delivered from different directions simultaneously.

Notes

References

Further reading

 
 
 
 
 
 
 
 
 

Naval warfare tactics